was a daimyō during the late Azuchi–Momoyama and early Edo periods. He was the son of Kuroda Kanbei, Toyotomi Hideyoshi's chief strategist and adviser.

Biography
His childhood name was Shojumaru (松寿丸). In 1577, when Nagamasa was a small child, his father was tried and sentenced as a spy by Oda Nobunaga. Nagamasa was kidnapped and nearly killed as a hostage. With the help of Yamauchi Kazutoyo and his wife, Takenaka Hanbei ended up rescuing him. After Nobunaga was killed in the Honnō-ji Incident in 1582, Nagamasa served Toyotomi Hideyoshi along with his father and participated in the invasion of Chūgoku.

Nagamasa also participated in Hideyoshi's Korean campaign, where he commanded the army's 3rd Division of 5000 men during the first invasion (1592–1593). In the second part of the campaign (1597-1598), he held command in The Army of the Right.

Battle Of Sekigahara

Nagamasa was one of the daimyo who were on bad terms with Ishida Mitsunari, due to the latter supposedly not rewarding all those who took part in the Korean invasions for his own benefits. 

Later in 1600, he took part in the Battle of Sekigahara on Tokugawa Ieyasu's side. His men killed Shima Sakon, thus securing a part of the Eastern Army's eventual victory. As a reward for his performance at the battle, Ieyasu granted Nagamasa Chikuzen  – 520.000 koku – in exchange for his previous fief of Nakatsu in Buzen.
Later in 1614-1615, he participated in the Osaka Castle campaigns.

Family
 Father: Kuroda Yoshitaka
 Mother: Kushihashi Teru (1553–1627)
 Wives:
 Itohime (1571-1645)
 Eihime (1585-1635)
 Concubine: Choshu’in
 Children:
 Kikuhime married Inoue Yukifusa's son by Itohime
 Kuroda Tadayuki (1602-1654) by Eihime
 Tokuko married Sakakibara Tadatsugu by Eihime
 Kameko married Ikeda Teruoki by Eihime
 Kuroda Nagaoki (1610-1665) by Eihime
 Kuroda Masafuyu by Choshu’in
 Kuroda Takamasa (1612-1639) by Eihime

In popular culture

Nagamasa is a playable character from the Eastern Army in the original Kessen.

Kuroda is also a popular historical figure. His life, and his relationship to Tokugawa, has been dramatized many times in the annual NHK Taiga Drama series.

 Taikoki (1965)
 Hara no Sakamichi (1971)
 Ougon no Hibi (1978)
 Onna Taikoki (1981)
 Tokugawa Ieyasu (1983)
 Kasuga no Tsunobe (1989)
 Hideyoshi (1996)
 Aoi Tokugawa Sandai (2000)
 Komyo ga Tsuji (2006)
 Gunshi Kanbei (2014)

Notes

References

Samurai
1568 births
1623 deaths
Converts to Roman Catholicism
Daimyo
People of the Japanese invasions of Korea (1592–1598)
Kuroda clan
Japanese Roman Catholics
People from Himeji, Hyōgo